Burqa is a Palestinian village  in the Nablus Governorate in northern West Bank, located  northwest of Nablus. According to the Palestinian Central Bureau of Statistics (PCBS), the village had a population of 4,030 inhabitants in mid-year 2006.

Location
It is bordered by Beit Imrin and Nisf Jubeil to the east, Jaba’, Fandaqumiya, Silat ad-Dhahr, and Al ‘Attara  to the north, ‘Anabta, Bizzariya and Ramin to the west, and Deir Sharaf and Sabastiya to the south.

History
Ceramics  from the late  Roman era have been found here, as has ceramics from the Byzantine  era, and Early Muslim era.

Ottoman era
Burqa was incorporated into the Ottoman Empire in 1517 with all of Palestine, and in 1596 it appeared in the  tax registers as being in the Nahiya of Jabal Sami, part of the  Sanjak of Nablus. It had a population of 15  households, all Muslim. The villagers paid a fixed tax rate of 33,3% on various agricultural products, such as wheat, barley, summer crops, olives, goats or beehives, a press for olives or grapes, in addition to occasional revenues; a total of 5,132  akçe.

In 1838,  Edward Robinson described Burqa as "a large village situated upon a sort of terrace on the side of the northern ridge, overlooking the whole basin of  Sebustieh." He further noted that the village had a mixture of Greek Christians and Muslim inhabitants.

In 1863, Victor Guérin found the village to have one thousand inhabitants.

In 1882, the PEF's Survey of Western Palestine described Burka  as a "A large stone village on a terrace, with a good grove of olives and two springs to the west, and well to the south. The road ascends the pass through the village. There are cactus hedges round the gardens north of the village, and a large threshing-floor in the middle of the place  which is built in a straggling manner along the hill-side. Some of its inhabitants are Greek Christians."

British Mandate era
In the  1922 census of Palestine conducted  by the British Mandate authorities, Burqa  had a population of 1,688; 1,589 Muslims and 99 Christians,  where the Christians were 56 Orthodox, 41 Roman Catholics and 2 Church of England. In the 1931 census it  had  448 houses and a population of  1,890; 1,785 Muslims and 105 Christians.

In  the 1945 statistics, Burqa  had a  population of 2,590; 2,410 Muslims and 180 Christians, with 18,486  dunams of land, according to an official land and population survey. Of this, 2,451 dunams were plantations and irrigable land, 8,283  used for cereals, while 173 dunams were built-up land.

There were Christians living in the village until 1946, when they moved to Haifa.

Jordanian era
In the wake of the 1948 Arab–Israeli War, and after the 1949 Armistice Agreements, Burqa  came under Jordanian rule.

The Jordanian census of 1961 found 3,352 inhabitants.

Post 1967
Since the Six-Day War in 1967, Burqa has been under  Israeli occupation. The population in the 1967 census conducted by Israel was 2,477, of whom 92  originated from the Israeli territory.

After the 1995 accords, 27% of the village land is defined as being in Area A, 29% in Area B, while the remaining 44% is defined as being Area C land. Israel confiscated 1,014 dunams of land from Burqa in order to establish the Israeli settlement of Homesh. The settlement was evacuated in 2005, but later used by the Israelis as a military base.

In 2017 construction of a women's centre funded by UN Women and Norway was done and the centre was subsequently named Dalal Mughrabi Women Community Center after a Palestinian woman who was killed in 1978 when she with 8 other militants in 1978 hijacked two buses in Israel, an incident which claimed the lives of 38 civilians, of whom many were children. As she is considered a terrorist in Norway, the Norwegian government asked for their funds to be reimbursed as Norway does not support violence.

References

Bibliography

External links
   Welcome to Burqa
Burqa, Welcome to Palestine
Survey of Western Palestine, Map 11:    IAA, Wikimedia commons
 Burqa village profile,   Applied Research Institute–Jerusalem (ARIJ)
   Burqa  (aerial photo), ARIJ
 Development priorities and needs in Burqa, ARIJ

Nablus Governorate
Villages in the West Bank
Throne villages
Municipalities of the State of Palestine